Wolfenstein: Youngblood is a 2019 first-person shooter developed by MachineGames and Arkane Studios and published by Bethesda Softworks. A spin-off of the Wolfenstein series, the game was released for Windows, Nintendo Switch, PlayStation 4, and Xbox One in July 2019 and Stadia in November 2019 as a launch title. The game received mixed reviews from critics who felt it was a step down from previous installments, although some reviewers praised the combat.

Gameplay
The player assumes control of either Jessie or Zofia Blazkowicz from a first-person perspective; an optional cooperative multiplayer mode is included. Players can complete the game with another player or with an artificial intelligence substitute. Missions can be completed in a non-linear order, and players can unlock new gear and abilities as they progress in the game.

Plot
Twenty years after Wolfenstein II: The New Colossus, America and much of the world is liberated from Nazi control and B.J. Blazkowicz and his wife Anya have raised their twin daughters Jessie and Zofia, teaching them how to defend themselves. In 1980, Blazkowicz mysteriously disappears without a trace. Jessie, Zofia, and their friend Abby, Grace Walker's daughter, discover a hidden room in the attic with a map indicating Blazkowicz traveled to Nazi-occupied Neu-Paris to meet the French Resistance. Believing that American authorities will not follow Blazkowicz to Nazi France, the girls steal an FBI helicopter and a pair of powered armor suits and head for France.

In France, the girls meet Juju, the leader of the Resistance, who confirms that she had met Blazkowicz, but she has no knowledge of his current location. They discover that he is trying to find a way into a secret Nazi installation called Lab X. In order to gain access to Lab X, the girls decide to help the Resistance hack the main computers of the "Brothers", a trio of security towers that hold the keys to Lab X. Upon reviewing the data in the Brothers' computers, Abby realizes that Juju is a Nazi agent and her partner is General Lothar, the disgraced commander of the Nazi forces in Neu-Paris. The girls pretend to drink Juju's drugged wine, and Lothar gloats that with the Brothers under his control, he can commence his plans to start a Fourth Reich without interference from his superiors in Berlin. A struggle ensues, with Lothar and Juju managing to escape while Abby is stabbed in her left eye.

Abby directs Jessie and Zofia to find Lab X. She explains that the Nazi leadership attempted to kill Lothar for disobeying their orders, forcing him into hiding where he eventually infiltrated the French Resistance with Juju. Jessie and Zofia breach Lab X and proceed to its deepest level, where they find Blazkowicz. He tells them that after he killed Hitler in the 1960s, he accidentally activated a doomsday device that will eventually render the Earth uninhabitable. He traveled to Lab X to find a way to stop the doomsday device, where he learned about the existence of multiple alternate dimensions, and glimpsed one where the Nazis lost World War II. He then uses a Da'at Yichud artifact to upgrade Jessie and Zofia's powered armor suits and directs them to go after Lothar. Meanwhile, Lothar retakes his old headquarters and orders his allies in Berlin to stage a coup against the government. Jessie and Zofia confront Juju and Lothar and kill them both.

Afterwards, Anya and Grace arrive. Realizing the threat the Fourth Reich poses, Blazkowicz, Anya, and Grace decide to call upon all their allies around the world to fight the Fourth Reich. Jessie, Zofia, and Abby decide to stay in Paris to defend it against the Fourth Reich's inevitable counterattack.

Development
Bethesda announced the game at Electronic Entertainment Expo 2018. The title was developed by MachineGames, which led the development of the rebooted Wolfenstein series, and Arkane Studios' office in Lyon, which previously handled the development of the Dishonored series. Initially the game was a narrative adventure focusing on only one of the twins. However, during internal testing and feedback phase, the team expanded the scope of the story to include both twins as the game's duo protagonists and added a cooperative multiplayer mode so that two players can complete the game as the twin sisters together. The game's Deluxe Edition includes a Buddy Pass, which can be gifted to a player who does not own a copy of the game. The Buddy Pass enables that player to download and play the game without buying it, on the condition that they play it in the same game session with the player who grants them the pass. Wolfenstein: Youngblood was released for Windows (via Steam and Bethesda Store), Nintendo Switch, PlayStation 4 and Xbox One on July 26, 2019. The development of the Switch version was outsourced to Panic Button. Although the Nintendo Switch version will have a standard and a Deluxe Edition retail release, no actual physical game card will be included, and a download code will be offered instead.

Wolfenstein: Youngblood and the simultaneously released Wolfenstein: Cyberpilot were the first games to make use of the "social adequacy clause" introduced by Unterhaltungssoftware Selbstkontrolle (USK; the German software ratings board) in August 2018, which allowed the use of Nazi imagery in video games in relevant scenarios, reviewed on a case-by-case basis. Despite being officially rated by USK, major German retailers, such as MediaMarkt, Saturn, and GameStop, refused to sell the uncensored version, offering only the separately sold German version, which lacks all Nazi imagery and references and features German as the only language option.

Reception

Wolfenstein: Youngblood received "mixed or average" reviews, according to review aggregator Metacritic. IGN gave a score of 6.5/10, saying it "doesn’t come close to recapturing the joy of its predecessor", while GameSpot gave a score of 8/10 for "challenging combat encounters" and "light RPG elements that spice up the solid gunplay" better than its previous installment. PC Gamer rated the game favorably with a 79/100 score.

Sales
Wolfenstein: Youngblood became the second-best-selling retail game in the United Kingdom three days after its release behind Fire Emblem: Three Houses. In Japan, approximately 2,740 physical units for PS4 were sold during its launch week, becoming the number 20 selling game of any format.

References

External links
 

2019 video games
Action-adventure games
Arkane Studios games
Bethesda Softworks games
Cooperative video games
Dystopian video games
Federal Bureau of Investigation in fiction
First-person shooters
MachineGames games
Nazis in fiction
Nazism in fiction
Nintendo Switch games
PlayStation 4 games
Retrofuturistic video games
Single-player video games
Stadia games
Terrorism in fiction
Video game spin-offs
Video games about Nazi Germany
Video games developed in France
Video games developed in Sweden
Video games featuring female protagonists
Video games scored by Tom Salta
Video games set in Paris
Video games set in 1980
Video games using Havok
Windows games
Wolfenstein
Video games about World War II alternate histories
Xbox Cloud Gaming games
Xbox One games